Bhatti Ke, is a town and Union Council in Wazirabad Tehsil, Gujranwala District, Punjab, Pakistan.

See also

 Gujranwala
 Wazirabad
 Badoki Saikhwan
 Qila Didar Singh

References

Cities and towns in Gujranwala District
Populated places in Wazirabad Tehsil
Union councils of Wazirabad Tehsil